Kamila Thompson is a singer-songwriter based in London and New York. She is more commonly known as Kami Thompson. She has been seen touring with Bonny Prince Billy, Teddy Thompson, Sean Lennon and others, as well as appearances with the Wainwright clan at Carnegie Hall and with a host of illustrious artists at Hal Willner's "Came So Far for Beauty" Leonard Cohen tribute in Dublin. Her debut recording, an EP Bad Marriage, was released in June 2010. Her debut album Love Lies was released in the UK on Warner Music in 2011. Thompson also performs and records as part of the band The Rails with husband James Walbourne. The band's first EP Habit was released on Edwyn Collins' label AED Records in early 2012, and their debut album Fair Warning was released on Island Records' legendary Pink label on 5 May 2014.

Early life and family
Thompson is the youngest child of Richard and Linda Thompson. Her older brother is Teddy Thompson.

Career
Thompson was backing and harmony vocalist on Linda Thompson's 2002 album Fashionably Late and Linda's 2007 album Versatile Heart, which also features a track written by Kamila called "Nice Cars".

She was an opener on the tour of Sean Lennon. She has also toured with Will Oldham (Bonny Prince Billy) in Australia and New Zealand and performed in Hal Willner's "Came So Far for Beauty" tribute to Leonard Cohen in Dublin in 2006 as well as the Wainwright Family's Christmas show at Carnegie Hall.

On 24 October 2011, Kami released her debut full-length album Love Lies, on Warner Music UK.

Thompson is featured on Sam Sallon's 2013 album One for the Road singing a duet on the song "It's Not Hard to Lose Your Way".

In 2014, Kami's band The Rails, featuring her husband James Walbourne, released their debut album Fair Warning. Later that year, The Rails appear on the album Family (2014) by Thompson (the band being named for all the Thompsons that appear), having written two songs for the project.

Kami features on the track "Your Baby", from Jinnwoo's debut album Strangers Bring Me No Light, released on 2 September 2016.

Releases

Solo albums

Solo EPs

Albums with The Rails

Features and appearances

References

External links
Kami Thompson Official website
 Dead Flamingoes Dead Flamingoes' Official Website
Kamila Thompson's MySpace Music MySpace page
Last FM Profile

Living people
British  women songwriters
1983 births
21st-century British  women singers